The 2000–01 Slovak First Football League (known as the Mars superliga for sponsorship reasons) was the eighth season of first-tier football league in Slovakia, since its establishment in 1993. This season started on 18 July 2000 and ended on 13 June 2001. AŠK Inter Slovnaft Bratislava are the defending champions.

Teams
A total of 10 teams was contested in the league, including 9 sides from the 1999–2000 season and one promoted from the 2. Liga.

The seven teams (Koba Senec, ZTS Dubnica, 1. HFC Humenné, FC Nitra, DAC 1904 Dunajská Streda, Dukla Banská Bystrica and Baník Prievidza) were relegated to the 2000–01 2. Liga due to the decision of the organization of Mars superliga, that the number of teams in the league should be reduced from 16 to 10 teams from that season.

These relegated teams were replaced by FK Matador Púchov.

Stadiums and locations

League table

Results

First half of season

Second half of season

Season statistics

Top scorers

See also
2000–01 Slovak Cup
2000–01 2. Liga (Slovakia)

References

External links
RSSSF.org (Tables and statistics)

Slovak Super Liga seasons
Slovak
1